Thondaman may refer to:

 Arumugam Thondaman (born 1964), Cabinet Minister of Livestock and Rural Community Development in Sri Lanka
 Jeevan Thondaman (born 1994), Sri Lankan politician
 Ramamirda Thondaman, Indian politician and former Member of the Legislative Assembly of Tamil Nadu
 Savumiamoorthy Thondaman (1913–1999), Sri Lankan politician who represented the Indian Tamils of Sri Lanka
 Thondaman Dynasty derive from the state of Pudkottai, which was created by Raghunatha Thondaiman

See also

Thandan
Thandivarman
Thondaiman
Tondaiman
Tondaimans

Tamil masculine given names